The killing off of a character is a device in fiction, whereby a character dies, but the story continues. The term, frequently applied to television, film, video game, anime, manga and chronological series, often denotes an untimely or unexpected death motivated by factors beyond the storyline.

In productions featuring actors, the unwillingness or inability of an actor to continue with the production for financial or other reasons (including illness, death, or producers' unwillingness to retain an actor) may lead to that character being "killed off" or phased out from the storyline in another way.

Examples

Literature 

"The Final Problem" by Conan Doyle ends with Sherlock Holmes plunging to his death at the Reichenbach Falls, in struggle with his arch enemy Professor Moriarty. There is ample evidence that Doyle fully intended this to be Holmes' definite and final end. Doyle wanted to write no more Sherlock Holmes stories, feeling that they were distracting him from more serious literary efforts and that "killing off" Holmes was the only way of getting his career back on track. "I must save my mind for better things," he wrote to his mother, "even if it means I must bury my pocketbook with him." Conan Doyle sought to sweeten the pill by letting Holmes go in a blaze of glory, having him rid the world of a criminal so powerful and dangerous that any further task would be trivial in comparison; indeed, Holmes says as much in the story. However, the Holmes fans refused to be mollified, continually protesting and pressuring Doyle until he brought their hero back to life.

Alexander Dumas wrote The Three Musketeers which proved highly successful, and added several sequels. However, the final one, The Vicomte of Bragelonne: Ten Years Later, ends with the death of all the Musketeers, one by one – making clear to readers that he would write no more of them.

Science fiction writer Harry Turtledove has produced many series of Alternative History depicting alternate versions of various wars (the American Civil War, The First and Second World Wars, the Korean War etc.). Such Turtledove books typically include a large cast of alternating point of view characters, drawn from both sides of the conflict, whose lives continually interweave with each other in the book's plot. In such books, Turtledove is in the frequent habit of suddenly killing off one or more of his characters, often a sympathetic one to whom readers were attracted. In some of these cases, a soldier character is depicted as getting unscathed through very heavy fighting and then getting killed in a trivial skirmish or incident – which does happen in real war but rarely in fictional depictions.

Television 
Because of the episodic format of television shows, audience feedback and approval is often a factor in whether or not a character is killed off. Damon Lindelof, executive producer of Lost, has been quoted as saying that despite the widespread hate for Nikki and Paulo, "We had a plan when we introduced them, and we didn't get to fully execute that plan. But when the plan is executed, [they] will be iconic characters on the show." In an example of a character being killed off as a result of an actor leaving the show, Raymond Cruz's character Tuco Salamanca on Breaking Bad was killed off because he found the part too difficult to play. Characters may be killed off when the actors die. John Ritter's character in 8 Simple Rules was written to have died off screen after Ritter himself died during taping of the show.

Mr. Hooper of the PBS Kids show, Sesame Street, is another example of a character "killed off." When actor Will Lee died on December 7, 1982, the staff of Children's Television Workshop were thinking of recasting Mr. Hooper, or quietly having the character retire from the show. Instead, they made a special tribute episode where humans explained to Big Bird that Mr. Hooper had died and told Big Bird about the irreversibility of death. The episode aired on November 24, 1983.

The Palestinian children's character Farfur (a Mickey Mouse lookalike) is an example of a character "killed off" for political reasons in 2007. After the program received criticism from some government ministers in both Palestine and Israel, as well as from the Disney family, for espousing anti-Israeli and antisemitic sentiments, the Farfur character was killed off. Even his death, at the hands of an "Israeli agent", making Farfur a "martyr", was similarly politicised.

The Simpsons killed off Edna Krabappel after the death of her late voice artist Marcia Wallace on October 25, 2013.

Planters killed off its century-old mascot Mr. Peanut in an advertising campaign leading up to Super Bowl LIV, only to resurrect him as a baby during a commercial during that game.

When racing driver Perry McCarthy left the television show Top Gear, his character, The Stig, was 'killed off' in a stunt involving driving a Jaguar off an aircraft carrier; he was replaced with a similar but white-suited version of the same character.

After the death of Dan Blocker in 1972, Bonanza ended after its 14th season in 1973 without his character Hoss Cartwright. The result of having his character killed off did not occur until the TV film adaptation Bonanza: The Next Generation in 1988.

In the Dinosaurs' infamous finale "Changing Nature", all the dinosaur characters are killed off by the coming of Ice age, leaving the audiences in shock ever since. Michael Jacobs stated that "We certainly wanted to make the episode to be educational to the audience", and as people knew dinosaurs were no longer alive, "The show would end by completing the metaphor and showing that extinction."

Film
Doc Hudson, from the 2006 Pixar film Cars, is killed off from the subsequent Cars series due to his actor, Paul Newman, died of lung cancer in 2008. John Lasseter included the tribute to the character in Cars 3.

In the 1998 sequel Blues Brothers 2000, John Belushi's character, Jake Blues, is killed off before the event of this film due to Belushi died of combined drug intoxication in 1982. Jim Belushi was originally set to replace his brother’s character as Brother Zee Blues, but was cut due to being under the contract with ABC while casting for the TV series Total Security. Prior to the sequel, an animated series based on the 1980 film was in the works and was scheduled to air in 1997. Peter Aykroyd and Jim Belushi were going to replace the original actors. Unfortunately, it was canceled due to the original actors for The Blues Brothers are deemed irreplaceable.

Some characters after the deaths of their actors are not killed off, but are forced to be phased out, like Anne-Marie from All Dogs Go to Heaven who could not be recast in subsequent films after the murder of Judith Barsi in 1988. Her character is replaced by David afterwards, as well as pushing the timeline further in the present day.

Comics 

Death is a frequently used dramatic device in comic book fiction, and in particular superhero fiction. Unlike stories in television or film, character deaths are rarely by unforeseen behind-the-scenes events, as there is no analogous situation to having actors portraying characters. Instead, characters are typically killed off as part of the story or occasionally by editorial mandate to generate publicity for a title. Teasers may hint at characters' deaths for an extended period. A number of factors often mean that the changes are not permanent.

Extremely long print runs make the popularity of characters (with writers and fans) and occasionally rights issues for using the character in licensed adaptations often make characters often be brought back to life by later writers. That can happen either as a depiction of their literal resurrection or by retcon, a revision that changes earlier continuity and establishes the character not to have died in the first place. This phenomenon is known as the comic book death. Killing off a main character such as Superman, Batman or Captain America can often lead to an uptick in publicity for a comic book and high sales for the story in which they are inevitably brought back to life.

Some writers have also criticized the trend for killing off supporting characters, particularly when female characters are killed off brutally to elicit a strong reaction in the male protagonist. This is known as the Women in Refrigerators trope.
Specifically, the Death of Gwen Stacy, long-time girlfriend of Spider-Man, caused great shock and long-lasting controversy among fans.

Charlotte Braun, a character in the comic strip Peanuts, was killed off less than a year after being introduced after Charles Schulz recelved negative feedback about her. A letter to one of the child critics who had called for Braun's removal included a warning that the critics would bear the responsibility for the "death of an innocent child" and depicted Braun with an axe in her head. Braun's death was never explicitly addressed in officially published Peanuts media.

LGBTQ characters 

LGBT activists and fans have long criticized the tendency in U.S. media for LGBT characters, especially queer women, to be killed off or otherwise meet an unhappy fate more often than straight characters. This trope is known colloquially as "bury your gays" or "dead lesbian syndrome". In recent years, some LGBT showrunners and writers have made steps to avert this, such as ND Stevenson with She-Ra and the Princesses of Power.

See also 
 Spin off

References 

Television terminology
Film and video terminology
Video game terminology
Anime and manga terminology
Literary terminology
Fiction about death